Bernard Destraz (born 25 May 1955) is a Swiss rower. He competed in the men's single sculls event at the 1980 Summer Olympics.

References

1955 births
Living people
Swiss male rowers
Olympic rowers of Switzerland
Rowers at the 1980 Summer Olympics
Place of birth missing (living people)